Luigi Sacco (1 August 1883 in Alba – 5 December 1970 in Rome) was an Italian general and cryptanalyst.

Bibliography
Manual of Cryptology ("Manuale di Crittografia") (1936)

References

People from Alba, Piedmont
Italian military personnel of World War II
Italian generals
Italian cryptographers
1970 deaths
1883 births